County Cork was a parliamentary constituency in Ireland, represented in the Parliament of the United Kingdom. From 1801 to 1885 it returned two Members of Parliament (MPs) to the House of Commons of the United Kingdom of Great Britain and Ireland.

At the 1885 general election, following the Redistribution of Seats Act 1885, County Cork was divided into seven parliamentary divisions: East Cork, Mid Cork, North Cork, North East Cork, South Cork, South East Cork and West Cork.

Since 1922, the area no longer elects UK members of parliament, as it is no longer in the United Kingdom.

Boundaries 
This constituency comprised the whole of County Cork, except for the city of Cork and the boroughs of Bandon, Kinsale, Mallow and Youghal.

Members of Parliament

Elections 

1654 Roger Boyle, afterwards Earl of Orrery, born 25 April 1621, died 16 October 1679 aged 58
1801 (no formal election), (1) Henry Boyle, Viscount Boyle, later Earl of Shannon (to 1807), b. 8 August 1771, d. 22 April 1842 aged 70; (2) Robert Uniacke Fitzgerald, b. 17 March 1751, d. 20 December 1814 aged 63
1806 17 November, George Ponsonby (to 1812), b. 1773, d. 5 June 1863 aged 90
1807 16 May, James Bernard, Viscount Bernard, later Earl of Bandon (to 1818), b. 14 June 1785, d. 31 October 1856 aged 71
1812 23 October, Richard Hare, Viscount Ennismore (to 1827), b. 20 March 1773, d. 24 September 1827 aged 54
1818 29 June, Edward King, Viscount Kingsborough,(Whig), b. 16 November 1795, d. 27 February 1837 aged 41
1826, 21 June, Robert Henry King, after Earl of Kingston (to 1832), (Whig), b. 4 October 1796, d. 21 January 1867 aged 70
1827, 4 December, John Boyle, b. 13 March 1803, d. 6 December 1874 aged 71

Elections in the 1830s

 On petition, O'Connor was declared not qualified and unseated in favour of Longfield

Elections in the 1840s

 

O'Connell's death caused a by-election.

Elections in the 1850s

Power was appointed Lieutenant-Governor of Saint Lucia, resigning and causing a by-election.

Roche was elevated to the peerage, becoming 1st Baron Fermoy and causing a by-election.

 

Deasy was appointed Solicitor-General for Ireland, requiring a by-election.

Elections in the 1860s
Deasy was appointed Attorney-General for Ireland, requiring a by-election.

Deasy resigned after being appointed a Baron of the Exchequer, causing a by-election.

Barry's death caused a by-election.

Elections in the 1870s

Downing's death caused a by-election.

Elections in the 1880s

Divided 1885 into seven divisions 

East Cork (UK Parliament constituency)
Mid Cork (UK Parliament constituency)
North Cork (UK Parliament constituency)
North-East Cork (UK Parliament constituency)
South Cork (UK Parliament constituency)
South-East Cork (UK Parliament constituency)
West Cork (UK Parliament constituency)

References 

The Parliaments of England by Henry Stooks Smith (1st edition published in three volumes 1844–50), 2nd edition edited (in one volume) by F.W.S. Craig (Political Reference Publications 1973)
,Leigh Rayment, David Dickson Old World Colony Corl and South Munster 1630-1830 Cork University Press 2005, Famine in West Cork Fr. Patrick Hickey Mercier Press 2002

Westminster constituencies in County Cork (historic)
Constituencies of the Parliament of the United Kingdom established in 1801
Constituencies of the Parliament of the United Kingdom disestablished in 1885